The 42nd New Brunswick Legislative Assembly represented New Brunswick between February 11, 1953, and April 17, 1956.

David Laurence MacLaren served as Lieutenant-Governor of New Brunswick.

E. T. Kennedy was chosen as speaker in 1953. After Kennedy died, Walter Powers succeeded him as speaker in 1954. J. Arthur Moore became speaker in 1955 after Powers' death.

The Progressive Conservative Party led by Hugh John Flemming defeated the Liberals to form the government.

History

Members 

Notes:

References 
 Canadian Parliamentary Guide, 1956, PG Normandin

Terms of the New Brunswick Legislature
1952 establishments in New Brunswick
1956 disestablishments in New Brunswick
20th century in New Brunswick